Ibrahim ibn al-Husayn ibn Ali ibn Muhammad ibn al-Walid was the eleventh Tayyibi Isma'ili Dāʿī al-Muṭlaq in Yemen, from 1287 to his death in 1328.

Life
Ibrahim was a member of the Banu al-Walid al-Anf family, that dominated the office of Dāʿī al-Muṭlaq almost continuously in the 13th to early 16th centuries. He was the son of the eighth Dāʿī, Al-Husayn ibn Ali, and brother of the ninth Dāʿī, Ali ibn al-Husayn. Ibrahim moved his seat from Sanaa to the fortress of Af'ida, and in 1325 he took over the town of Kawkaban, where he started gathering military forces to oppose the Zaydi imams. 

He was succeeded by Muhammad ibn Hatim (1327–1328), who in turn was succeeded by Ibrahim's son Ali Shams al-Din I.

Tomb
His grave, along with those of the 12th and 13th Dāʿīs, were hidden and unknown until recently, when the archaeological authority of Yemen, along with Dawoodi Bohras living there, located them on Hisn Af'ida. On 25 November 2018, Mufaddal Saifuddin, the 53rd Dāʿī al-Muṭlaq, unveiled its existence. A mausoleum will soon be made and declared open.

References

Sources
 

Year of birth unknown
1328 deaths
Banu al-Walid al-Anf
Tayyibi da'is
13th-century births
13th century in Yemen
14th century in Yemen
13th-century Arabs
14th-century Arabs
13th-century Ismailis
14th-century Ismailis
13th-century Islamic religious leaders
14th-century Islamic religious leaders